National Geographic (formerly National Geographic Channel) is a Canadian English language discretionary specialty channel owned by Corus Entertainment and National Geographic Channel (U.S.). It features documentary and human interest programming that explores the natural world. The service, like its international counterparts, is based on National Geographic Magazine.

Programming
Programming includes specials and theme weeks such as 'Pharaoh's Week' and 'Shark Week'. The programs broadcast revolve around the following topics: wildlife, history, science and technology, people and culture, and travel and adventure.

History

In November 2000, Alliance Atlantis (on behalf of a corporation to be incorporated) was granted approval by the Canadian Radio-television and Telecommunications Commission (CRTC) to launch a national English-language Category 2 specialty television service called National Geographic Channel. It was described  as a service that will "feature documentary programming in the areas of geography, world cultures, anthropology, remote exploration, natural conservation and geo-politics. Its programs will draw on pre-eminent resources, talent and expertise and use rare and spectacular images, riveting storytelling and innovative technology to bring the pages of the National Geographic Magazine to life."

The channel was launched on September 7, 2001 under the ownership of Alliance Atlantis and the U.S.-based National Geographic Channel. 
On December 19, 2006, Alliance Atlantis launched a high definition simulcast of National Geographic Channel. It is available through all major TV providers in Canada.

On January 18, 2008, a joint venture between Canwest and Goldman Sachs Capital Partners known as CW Media bought Alliance Atlantis and gained AAC's interest in National Geographic Channel. On October 27, 2010, ownership changed again as Shaw Communications gained control of National Geographic Channel as a result of its acquisition of Canwest and Goldman Sachs' interest in CW Media.

On April 1, 2016, National Geographic Channel's parent company Shaw Media was sold to Corus Entertainment. Months later, National Geographic Channel was simply renamed to just National Geographic.

See also
 National Geographic Channel (UK)

References

External links
 

English-language television stations in Canada
Digital cable television networks in Canada
2001 establishments in Canada
Television channels and stations established in 2001
Corus Entertainment networks
Canada